The American Institute of Applied Music was a music school based in New York City.

 The Metropolitan College of Music (founded 1891)
 The Metropolitan Conservatory of Music (founded 1886)
 The Synthetic Piano School (founded 1887), and
 The American Institute of Normal Methods

Kate Sara Chittenden founded both the Metropolitan College of Music and the Synthetic Piano School.  She served as Dean and head of the piano department at the founding Metropolitan College in 1892, and continued in both capacities at the American Institute until 1933.

The school aimed for systematic thoroughness, with emphasis upon pedagogical method, largely with reference to those expecting to teach. The average enrollment was about 350 per year. The Grove's Dictionary of Music and Musicians published in 1920 stated that more than 1000 teachers had received certificates. The Institute was located at 212 West 59th Street.

Accreditation 
The National Association of Schools of Music, at its fifth annual meeting in 1928, accepted the Institute's application for membership.

Institutional structure 
New York's thirty-eighth University Convocation assembled June 25, 1900, in Albany and, among other things, granted a provisional charter to the American Institute of Applied Music, authorizing the issued of $15,000 capital stock.  The University of the State of New York represents colleges, academies and other institutions subject to the visitation of the Board of Regents.

Former faculty & administration 
Governance
 Edgar Oscar Silver (1860–1909), President
 John B. Calvert, D.D., President
Dean
 Kate Sara Chittenden (1856–1949) was the founding Dean and head of the piano department from 1892 to 1933.  During her lifetime, she taught more than 3000 students.
Faculty
 Modest Altschuler (1873–1963), Russian-American cellist, conductor, and composer
 Paul Ambrose (1868–1941)
 H. Rawlins Baker
 Walter S. Bogert (1865–1959)
 Dudley Buck (1839–1909), composer, author, organist
 Mary Fidelia Burt ( –1928), taught voice, sight singing, and ear training
 Adrienne Remenyi von Ende
 Herwegh von Ende (1877– ), director violin department
 Tom Karl (1846–1916), Irish-American tenor who, for a period, headed the vocal department
 George Coleman Gow (1860–1938), song composer, theory professor
 John Cornelius Griggs, PhD (1865–1932)
 Henry G. Hanchett, professor of musical analysis and pedagogy
 John Leslie Hodgson (1880– ), pianist
 Harry Benjamin Jepson (1870–1952), organist
 McCall L. Lanham (1877–1959), baritone voice teacher, director of the voice division
 Daniel Gregory Mason (1873–1953), composer
 William Mason (1829–1908), composer
 E Presson Miller (1864–1950), voice teacher
 Florence Viola Osborn
 Albert Ross Parsons (1847–1933)
 Janet Daniels Schenck (1883–1976), founder of the Manhattan School of Music
 Henry Schradieck (1846–1918), violinist
 Harry Rowe Shelley (1858–1947), organist and composer who taught harmony and counterpoint
 William Fairchild Sherman
 Raymond Huntington Woodman (1861–1943), organist, composer; 1889–1898 head of organ department Metropolitan College of Music; 1909–1941 head of theory department American Institute of Applied Music

Alumni 
 Harry H. Sukman (1912–1984), composer and arranger for the TV western series, The High Chaparral
 George King Raudenbush (1899–1956), violinist, orchestra conductor, and composer
 Ester Brooke,  Eberstadt
 Alfred Piccaver (1884–1958), British-American operatic tenor
Irene Stolofsky (1896-1950), violinist
Gertrude Hoag Wilson (1888-1968), composer and pianist
Mabel Madison Watson (1872-1952), composer and music educator

References 

Educational institutions established in 1900
Performing arts education in the United States
Music education in the United States
Music schools in New York City
Universities and colleges in New York City
Defunct private universities and colleges in New York City
History of New York City
1900 establishments in New York City